July Talk is a Canadian alternative rock band formed in 2012 in Toronto, Ontario.  The band consists of singers Peter Dreimanis and Leah Fay, guitarist Ian Docherty, bassist Josh Warburton, and drummers Danny Miles and Dani Nash. July Talk released its self-titled debut album with Sleepless Records on 16 October 2012 and its second album Touch on 9 September 2016.

Universal Music Canada released an extended version of the album in 2013. July Talk received a Juno Award for Alternative Album of the Year in 2015. The album went gold in Canada the same year. It was released to American audiences in the spring of 2015 through Island Records, and was joined by an EP in Canada titled For Your Bloodshot Eyes.

With a reputation for explosive live shows, July Talk has found most of their following on the road. Since the release of their debut album, they have toured Canada, the United States, Europe, and Australia, and played numerous festivals, including the WayHome Music and Arts Festival near Toronto, ON; Shaky Knees Music Festival in Atlanta, GA; Voodoo Music + Arts Experience in New Orleans, LA; Osheaga in Montreal, QC; Isle of Wight Festival in the UK; and Austin City Limits Music Festival in Austin, TX.

The band's second album, Touch, was released on 9 September 2016 by Sleepless Records in Canada, Island Records in the United States and Universal Music Group/Vertigo Records in Europe. "Push + Pull", the album's first single, held the #1 spot on the Canadian Alternative Radio charts for thirteen weeks in 2016 and was released on American Alternative Radio in September 2016.

Biography 

In 2010, Latvian-Canadian singer Peter Dreimanis approached Leah Fay after hearing her sing with art/folk group Mothers of Brides at The Communist's Daughter, a bar in Toronto. Dreimanis had just returned to the city following a European tour with The Mohawk Lodge and Eamon McGrath. Dreimanis and Fay began to record demos together, and soon formed July Talk with Josh Warburton, Danny Miles, and Eamon McGrath. Eight months later, McGrath left the band to focus on his own material and was replaced by Ian Docherty.

The band's ten-song debut album was released on 16 October 2012, by Sleepless Records. An extended version was released a year later in collaboration with Universal Music Canada. The extended version included four additional songs: "Summer Dress," "My Neck," "Black Lace," and "Headsick." In early 2015, the band recorded three additional songs for an American release with Island Records: "Gentleman," "Blood + Honey," and "Uninvited." These three songs were also released on a Canadian EP entitled For Your Bloodshot Eyes.

In 2013, after releasing their debut album, they toured with Billy Talent, Matt Mays, Arkells, Sam Roberts, The Besnard Lakes, Weezer, Matthew Good, and Tegan and Sara. July Talk was nominated for Breakthrough Group of the Year at the 2014 Juno Awards in Canada. During the live broadcast they presented the award for Group of the Year to Canadian Artists Tegan and Sara, alongside Canadian Rap Artist Shad. In 2015, July Talk won a Juno for Alternative Album of the Year for their debut album July Talk. They have since opened for bands such as Spoon, Red Hot Chili Peppers, Weezer, Alabama Shakes, Frank Turner, Against Me! and The National.

In 2015, Dreimanis and Fay created July Talk Votes to encourage young voters to participate in the Canadian federal election. More than 1000 voters under 25 tweeted a photo of themselves at a polling station and received a phone call from the band thanking them for their involvement.

Leah Fay had the lead role in the 2015 film Diamond Tongues, under the name Leah Goldstein. She received a Canadian Screen Award nomination for Best Actress at the 4th Canadian Screen Awards in 2016.

Peter Dreimanis is also known for his cover of Creedence Clearwater Revival's classic, "Bad Moon Rising" which was used in multiple television shows, films and video games such as The Walking Dead, Green Room and Teen Wolf. The cover was released under the moniker Mourning Ritual.

All three of the band's studio albums have won the Juno Award for Alternative Album of the Year.

Discography

Studio albums
 July Talk (2012)
 Touch (2016)
 Pray for It (2020)
 Remember Never Before (2023)

July Talk was released on 15 October 2012 by Sleepless Records. An extended version, containing three new songs, was released in 2013. Louis Roberts of CultureFly credits the album as "a tour de force in how to refresh a genre," adding, "the debut album from July Talk is an aggressive, assertive and irresistibly mischievous slice of 21st century blues-rock."

On 30 September 2014, July Talk released an EP titled For Your Bloodshot Eyes, which brought the three new songs included in the extended American album to their Canadian audience. When reviewing the album, Alyson Shane of The Spill Magazine wrote, "For Your Bloodshot Eyes serves two purposes: to continue to showcase the band’s exceptional talent, and to reaffirm that they are on the cusp of absolutely exploding in popularity. It is a must-hear."

On 9 September 2016, July Talk released their second album, Touch.

On 10 July 2020, July Talk released their third studio album, Pray for It, via Sleepless Records/BMG.

Singles

Music videos
Before forming July Talk, Peter Dreimanis and Josh Warburton ran Vulture Culture Films, a Toronto-based music video production company. Both brought their creative expertise to July Talk, staying closely involved in the direction, editing, and production of the band's distinctive videos.
 
Leah Fay has a BFA in contemporary dance from Concordia University in Montreal, and co-founded performance art collective WIVES. She choreographed the video for the band's number one single, "Push + Pull."

References

Citations

Musical groups established in 2012
Musical groups from Toronto
Canadian indie rock groups
2012 establishments in Ontario
Juno Award for Alternative Album of the Year winners